Koeleria vallesiana, the Somerset hair grass, is a grass species of the genus Koeleria. It grows in Europe, temperate Asia, and North America.

References and external links
 GrassBase - The Online World Grass Flora

Pooideae